Mount Wilbanks is a mound-shaped mountain that is partly ice covered but has a prominent bare rock east face, forming the east extremity of the Kohler Range in Marie Byrd Land in Antarctica. First roughly mapped by United States Geological Survey (USGS) from air photos obtained by U.S. Navy Operation Highjump in January 1947. Named by Advisory Committee on Antarctic Names (US-ACAN) for John R. Wilbanks, geologist with the United States Antarctic Research Program (USARP) Marie Byrd Land Survey party, 1966–67.

Mountains of Marie Byrd Land